Chongsheng Temple, may refer to:

 Chongsheng Temple (Fujian), in Minhou County, Fujian, China
 Chongsheng Temple (Shanxi), in Yushe County, Shanxi, China
 Chongsheng Temple (Yunnan), in Dali Town, Yunnan, China

Or, as :

 The Hall for Admiration of the Sage at the Beijing Temple of Confucius
 The Hall for Admiration of the Sage at the Temple of Confucius at Fuzimiao, Nanjing

Buddhist temple disambiguation pages